The 1986 ATP Championship, also known as the Cincinnati Open and Pringles Light Classic for sponsorship reasons, was a men's tennis tournament played on outdoor hard courts at the Lindner Family Tennis Center in Mason, Ohio, United States that was part of the 1986 Nabisco Grand Prix and the men's draw was held from August 18 through August 24, 1986. First-seeded Mats Wilander won the singles title.

Finals

Singles
 Mats Wilander defeated  Jimmy Connors, 6–4, 6–1
 It was Wilander's 2nd singles title of the year and the 21st of his career.

Doubles
 Mark Kratzmann  /  Kim Warwick defeated  Christo Steyn /  Danie Visser, 6–3, 6–4.

References

External links
 
 Association of Tennis Professionals (ATP) tournament profile

Cincinnati Open
Cincinnati Open
Cincinnati Masters
Cincin